NGC 5749 is an open cluster of stars positioned near the southwest border of the southern constellation of Lupus. It is located at a distance of 3,548 light years from the Sun. This is a poorly populated cluster that shows a low level of concentration; the Trumpler class is IV1p. Polarization measurements suggest there is a dust cloud within the cluster.

References

External links
 

Open clusters
Lupus (constellation)
5749